Robert Thirsk High School is a public senior high school in Calgary, Alberta, Canada. It derives its name from Robert Thirsk, a Canadian engineer and physician, and a former Canadian Space Agency astronaut. The high school is located in the Northwest Calgary community of Arbour Lake, and has a capacity of 1,500 students. 

Robert Thirsk High School officially opened in September 2013. Over 800 grade 10 and 11 students attend the first school year. The high school accommodates students from Citadel, Arbour Lake, Scenic Acres, Ranchlands, Hawkwood, Rocky Ridge, Royal Oak, and Nolan Hill.

The school offers career skills and fine arts programming, including:
Electro-technologies
Computer Sciences
Tech Theater
Construction
Cook trade
Health and human services
Media, design and communication
Natural sciences 
Drama
Dance
Band
Visual arts
The school is also home for some students who have special needs and attend the Adapted Learning Program.

References

External links 
 

Educational institutions established in 2013
High schools in Calgary
2013 establishments in Canada